Kostas Kubilinskas (1 July 1923 in Vilkaviškis district – 9 March 1962 near Moscow) was a Lithuanian poet known for his writing for children. Amongst his books is The Frog Queen, a 1974 collection of children's poetry illustrated by Algirdas Steponavicius and translated into English by Avril Pyman.

According to the Genocide and Resistance Research Centre of Lithuania, Kubilinskas served as a spy for the MGB so that his poems (seen as "ideologically incorrect" by the Soviet government) could be published. The centre's report alleges that during his time there he murdered , leader of the Šarūnas group of the Lithuanian partisan Dainava military district. A total of 15 Lithuanian freedom fighters died because of Kubilinskas' betrayal.

In 2007 his poem The Wolf with a Frozen Tail was adapted into an animated film directed by Rasa Joni, The Tail.

References

External links 
 

1923 births
1962 deaths
People from Marijampolė County
Lithuanian male poets
20th-century poets
Burials at Antakalnis Cemetery
Soviet poets